Frog Dreaming is a 1986 Australian family adventure film written by Everett De Roche and directed by Brian Trenchard-Smith. It starred Henry Thomas, Tony Barry, Rachel Friend and Tamsin West.

Plot
An American boy, Cody (Thomas), whose parents have died, lives in Australia with his guardian, Gaza. Cody is very imaginative, inventive, and inquisitive. He builds things in his garage, including a railbike which he uses to get around. Cody comes across some strange events happening in Devil's Knob national park associated with an Aboriginal myth about "Frog Dreamings" and Bunyips, terrifying water monsters that prey on humans. Cody tries to investigate. The occurrences revolve around a lake where a bunyip the locals call "Donkegin" supposedly lives. Another myth explored by the children is the story of the Kurdaitcha Man who acts as a sort of Australian version of the Boogey Man as well as a supernatural judge who deals out punishment. The children are told that he punishes any wrongs done according to the laws of the ancient Aborigines including harm to one another, murder of animals without need for food, and destroying the environment (his appearance being most notable according to myth when white men came). The Kurdaitcha Man supposedly wanders the countryside, specifically at night, and wears shoes made of Emu feathers in order to cover any tracks.

After Cody witnesses the centre of the lake erupting in bubbles, he discovers the desiccated body of a homeless man, Neville, in a tent nearby. The local police investigate but determine only that Neville likely died of a heart attack. Determined to pursue the mystery of the pond himself, Cody fashions a makeshift diving suit and proceeds to explore the murky bottom, but never comes back up. Thinking that he has drowned, the townsfolk decide to drain the lake to recover his body. However, before they can finish, Cody's friend Wendy observes an air toy in Cody's aquarium, and a book on old mining equipment, and realising Cody may be alive, rallies aid to send a diver team into the pond.
The diving team attempts to locate Cody and bring him an oxygen tank, but before they have a chance, the lake begins to bubble and seethe once more. Donkegin emerges with Cody in its jaws and raises its head in an unearthly cry, reminiscent of old, rusted metal. One of the officials recognizes the shape as lights penetrate the weeds and algae that cover Donkegin, giving it its monstrous appearance.

They discover that Donkegin is in fact an old donkey engine or a type of excavator or steam-shovel used in construction work years ago, and the lake is in fact a flooded quarry. It is also revealed that many items have accumulated at the bottom of the pond including a car, a bicycle, oil drums, and other assorted junk. The locals manage to get Cody out and to safety and dispel the myth of the monster in the water. The myth of the Kurdaitcha Man is further explored when Cody believes he sees him in a dream-like state putting the Donkey-Engine back into the pond. The Kurdaitcha Man is seen as an older Aboriginal man with the feather shoes.

The film ends with the mystery unfolded and Cody alongside his friends safe and sound with the Kurdaitcha Man and Donkegin still 'living' and active in their minds.

Cast
 Henry Thomas as Cody
 Tony Barry as Gaza
 Rachel Friend as Wendy
 Tamsin West as Jane
 John Ewart as Ricketts
 Dempsey Knight as Charlie Pride
 Chris Gregory as Wheatley
 Mark Knight as Henry
 Katy Manning as Mrs. Cannon
 Dennis Miller as Mr. Cannon

Production
The film was originally directed by Russell Hagg. However the producer and writer were not satisfied with progress and tracked down Brian Trenchard-Smith who had just finished an episode of Five Mile Creek and asked him to take over. Trenchard-Smith liked the script and was interested in working with Henry Thomas, so he accepted.

Scenes from the movie were filmed in the Victorian town of Woods Point in the Yarra Ranges National Park. Also the former quarry site of Moorooduc Quarry Flora and Fauna Reserve located in Mount Eliza, Victoria.

The film goes under several alternate titles, including The Go-Kids in the UK, The Quest in the US, The Spirit Chaser in Germany, Fighting Spirits in Finland and The Mystery of the Dark Lake in Italy, The Boy Who Chases Ghosts in Bulgaria, 1987, etc.

Box office
Frog Dreaming grossed $171,000 at the box office in Australia.<ref>{{Cite web |url=http://www.film.vic.gov.au/__data/assets/pdf_file/0004/967/AA4_Aust_Box_office_report.pdf |title=Victoria – Australian Films at the Australian Box Office |access-date=7 February 2015 |archive-url=https://web.archive.org/web/20140209075310/http://film.vic.gov.au/__data/assets/pdf_file/0004/967/AA4_Aust_Box_office_report.pdf |archive-date=9 February 2014 |url-status=dead }}</ref>

Reception
Glenn Dunks of sbs.com.au commented "comparable to the likes of Goonies, Flight of the Navigator, and The Monster Squad'', Trenchard-Smith's film harkens back to a time before most kids' films weren't just computer-generated."

Accolades

See also
 Cinema of Australia

References

External links
 
 Frog Dreaming at the National Film and Sound Archive
 Frog Dreaming at Oz Movies

1986 films
Australian children's adventure films
Australian drama films
Australian fantasy adventure films
Films directed by Brian Trenchard-Smith
Films scored by Brian May (composer)
Films set in Victoria (Australia)
Films shot in Victoria (Australia)
Miramax films
1980s English-language films